2019 in Korea may refer to:
2019 in North Korea
2019 in South Korea